Mastidiores is a genus of spiders in the family Zodariidae. It was first described in 1987 by Jocqué. , it contains only one species, Mastidiores kora, found in Kenya.

References

Endemic fauna of Kenya
Zodariidae
Monotypic Araneomorphae genera
Spiders of Africa